University International Sports Festival is a regional sports event scheduled to be held by Russia in Yekaterinburg. The sports festival is scheduled to be held from 19 August 2023 to 31 August 2023, where 4,000 athletes aged 17 to 23 from 22 countries will contest for 193 medal events across 14 sports. The event is also one of the main events to celebrate the 300th anniversary of the founding of Yekaterinburg.

Developments 
The sports festival was established after the cancellation of the 2023 Summer World University Games and suspension of Russian athletes in the 2021 Summer World University Games due to the Russian invasion of Ukraine in 2022. Athletes from Russia and its ally Belarus are expected to participate in games, members of BRICS, SCO and CIS are also invited.

On 28 January 2023, the first information bulletin was published on the official website of the University International Sports Festival in English and Russian.

Preparations
 An estimated 4,100 athletes from 246 universities from 94 countries of the world, including 23 universities in Russia are included in the games, where athletes could not be younger than 17 years old and no older than 26 years old. The organizing committee will recruit roughly 6,000 volunteers, which the games is expected to attract 250,000 spectaculars.
 The organizing committee will use the sports venues and athlete village, originally planned to host the cancelled 2023 Summer World University Games, for the sports festival.
 In December 2022, nine months before the festival, Head of the Department of State Housing Construction Supervision of the Sverdlovsk Region Alexei Rossolov inspected the construction site of the water sports palace, community center and games village. When being asked about whether construction work was obstructed by western sanctions, Rossolov responded by saying that "western sanctions have always interfered and will interfere. But some [of the materials] were replenished thanks to import substitution, something was purchased in advance. We know what is changing for us.” 
 In January 2023, Russian Minister of sports Oleg Matytsin revealed that the sports festival would not be competed in the format of national teams but university teams instead, citing that it is to "remove all psychological barriers for our colleagues from European countries" to let them "able to come to Russia without looking back at someone's discontent." Furthermore, he also revealed that Latin American and African nations would be invited as well in the festival.
 On 28 January 2023, the first two dormitories of the students' village were put into operation.

Logo 
On 1 February 2023, the logo for the University International Sports Festival is revealed. The basis of the logo are "EKAT", four multi-coloured letters that reflects the natural diversity of the host city, its forests and lakes, rivers and mountains, fields and plains. Meanwhile, straight lines used to feature  the Ural constructivism.

Venues
The sports festival will be held in the following venues:  
 Palace of Team Sports（Дворце игровых видов спорта）- volleyball, futsal
 Rhythmic Gymnastics Centre (Центре художественной и эстетической гимнастики）- rhythmic gymnastics
 Palace of Water Sports（Дворце водных видов спорта）- swimming, diving
 Judo Arena（Дворце дзюдо）- judo, sambo
 Ekaterinburg-Expo International Exhibition Centre （МВЦ «Екатеринбург-Экспо» и）- table tennis, badminton, boxing, basketball 3x3, taekwondo, wrestling 
 Greenwich Tennis Academy（Детской академии тенниса «Гринвич»）- tennis

Events
The following 14 sports will be contested in the games, and 189 medals distributed:

Participating nations
Members of the BRICS, SCO and CIS are invited to partake in the games. The following countries are chosen by the organizing committee initially. Later in March 2023, the Russian ambassador to China revealed that 94 countries are expected to compete at the Festival, but whether these countries are sending athletes to the games is still unconfirmed. 

Confirmed participants: 
 Russia (Host)
 Tajikistan

Countries which showed "interests" in sending university teams:
 Armenia
 Azerbaijan
 China
 Mongolia
 Kyrgyzstan
 Sri Lanka
 Turkey
 Vietnam

Invited countries:
 Afghanistan
 Brazil
 Belarus
 Cambodia
 India
 Iran
 Pakistan
 Kazakhstan
 Moldova
 Nepal
 South Africa
 Uzbekistan

References

University and college sports